Sar Kalateh-ye Kharab Shahr (also Romanized as Sar Kalāteh-ye Kharāb Shahr; also known as Sar Kalāteh) is a village in Chaharkuh Rural District, in the Central District of Kordkuy County, Golestan Province, Iran. At the 2006 census, its population was 3,060, in 769 families.

References 

Populated places in Kordkuy County